Mats Arvidsson (born 19 April 1958) is a Swedish former footballer who played as a defender.

Arvidsson played for Malmö FF, making 127 appearances for the one club he played for.

References

Association football defenders
Swedish footballers
Allsvenskan players
Malmö FF players
1958 births
Living people